Gravity is the third studio album by American saxophonist Kenny G. It was released in May 1985, and reached number 13 on the Billboard Jazz Albums chart, number 37 on the R&B/Hip-Hop Albums chart and number 97 on the Billboard 200.

Track listing

Personnel 
 Kenny G – saxophones, flutes, synthesizers, synth bass, drum machine programming, digital wind synth guitar solo (3), backing vocals (3, 4, 6), Synclavier (6), all instruments (7)
 Wayne A. Brathwaite – synthesizers,  bass guitar, synth bass, drum machine programming
 Roger Sause – synthesizers, synth bass, drum machine programming
 Kashif – synthesizers, synth bass, drum machine programming, percussion, backing vocals (1, 2), Synclavier (6)
 Sal Gallina – synthesizer programming (3)
 Barry J. Eastmond – acoustic piano (6)
 Peter Scherer – Synclavier (6)
 Rick McMillen – additional synthesizer programming (6), drum mutation (6)
 Fareed Abdul Haqq – guitar (6)
 John Raymond – guitar (6)
 Joe Shekani – guitar (6)
 Ira Siegel – guitar (6)
 Yogi Horton – drums
 Kenny McDougald – drums
 Tony Gable – percussion
 Bashiri Johnson – percussion, drum machine programming
 Yolanda Lee – backing vocals (1, 2, 3)
 Jeff Smith – backing vocals (1, 3)
 Andre Montague – backing vocals (2, 3, 4)
 Joe Wooten – backing vocals (6)

Production 
 Executive Producer – Kashif
 Producers – Kashif (all tracks); Wayne A. Brathwaite (Tracks 1 & 4); Kenny G (Tracks 4, 7 & 9).
 Engineers – Alec Head, Rick McMillen, Michael O'Reilly and Bruce Robbins.
 Assistant Engineers – Stephen Benben and John Harris
 Mastered by Howie Weinberg at Masterdisk (New York City, NY).
 Art Direction – Donn Davenport
 Design – Howard Fritzson
 Logo Graphics – Tony Gable
 Photography – Garry Gross
 Stylist – Hui Wang 
 Hair and Make-up – Gui Vrabi
 Clothing – Henry Lehr 
 Management – Fritz/Turner Management

Singles

References 

1985 albums
Kenny G albums
Arista Records albums